Pingasa blanda is a moth of the family Geometridae first described by Arnold Pagenstecher in 1900. It is found on New Guinea, on the Bismarck Archipelago and in Queensland, Australia.

Adults are off white with wide brown margins.

References

Moths described in 1900
Pseudoterpnini